Lithium bis(trimethylsilyl)amide is a lithiated organosilicon compound with the formula . It is commonly abbreviated as LiHMDS or Li(HMDS) (lithium hexamethyldisilazide - a reference to its conjugate acid HMDS) and is primarily used as a strong non-nucleophilic base and as a ligand. Like many lithium reagents, it has a tendency to aggregate and will form a cyclic trimer in the absence of coordinating species.

Preparation
LiHMDS is commercially available, but it can also be prepared by the deprotonation of bis(trimethylsilyl)amine with n-butyllithium. This reaction can be performed in situ.

Once formed, the compound can be purified by sublimation or distillation.

Reactions and applications

As a base
LiHMDS is often used in organic chemistry as a strong non-nucleophilic base. Its conjugate acid has a pKa of ~26, making it is less basic than other lithium bases, such as LDA (pKa of conjugate acid ~36), but it is more sterically hindered and hence less nucleophilic. It can be used to form various organolithium compounds, including acetylides or lithium enolates.

where Me = . As such, it finds use in a range of coupling reactions, particularly carbon-carbon bond forming reactions such as the Fráter–Seebach alkylation and mixed Claisen condensations.

As a ligand
Li(HMDS) can react with a wide range of metal halides, by a salt metathesis reaction, to give metal bis(trimethylsilyl)amides.

where X = Cl, Br, I and sometimes F

Metal bis(trimethylsilyl)amide complexes are lipophilic due to the ligand and hence are soluble in a range of nonpolar organic solvents, this often makes them more reactive than the corresponding metal halides, which can be difficult to solubilise. The steric bulk of the ligands causes their complexes to be discrete and monomeric; further increasing their reactivity. Having a built-in base, these compounds conveniently react with protic ligand precursors to give other metal complexes and hence are important precursors to more complex coordination compounds.

Niche uses
LiHMDS is volatile and has been discussed for use for atomic layer deposition of lithium compounds.

Structure
Like many organolithium reagents, lithium bis(trimethylsilyl)amide can form aggregates in solution. The extent of aggregation depends on the solvent. In coordinating solvents, such as ethers and amines, the monomer and dimer are prevalent. In the monomeric and dimeric state, one or two solvent molecules bind to lithium centers. With ammonia as donor base lithium bis(trimethylsilyl)amide forms a trisolvated monomer that is stabilized by intermolecular hydrogen bonds. In noncoordinating solvents, such as aromatics or pentane, the complex oligomers predominate, including the trimer. In the solid state structure is trimeric.

See also
Lithium amide
Lithium diisopropylamide
Lithium tetramethylpiperidide

References

Bis(trimethylsilyl)amides
Lithium compounds
Non-nucleophilic bases
Organolithium compounds
Reagents for organic chemistry